Fash is a village in Fash Rural District, in the Central District of Kangavar County, Kermanshah Province, Iran. At the 2006 census, its population was 1,925, in 506 families.

References 

Populated places in Kangavar County